ISO 3166-2:MD is the entry for Moldova in ISO 3166-2, part of the ISO 3166 standard published by the International Organization for Standardization (ISO), which defines codes for the names of the principal subdivisions (e.g., provinces or states) of all countries coded in ISO 3166-1.

Currently for Moldova, ISO 3166-2 codes are defined for 1 autonomous territorial unit, 3 cities, 32 districts, and 1 territorial unit. The three cities have special status equal to the districts.

Each code consists of two parts, separated by a hyphen. The second part is two letters.

Due to limited international recognition, Transnistria is considered part of Moldova and does not have its own ISO 3166-1 code.

Current codes
Subdivision names are listed as in the ISO 3166-2 standard published by the ISO 3166 Maintenance Agency (ISO 3166/MA).

Subdivision names are sorted in Romanian alphabetical order: a, ă, â, b-i, î, j-s, ș, t, ț, u-z.

Click on the button in the header to sort each column.

Changes
The following changes to the entry have been announced in newsletters by the ISO 3166/MA since the first publication of ISO 3166-2 in 1998. ISO stopped issuing newsletters in 2013.

The following changes to the entry are listed on ISO's online catalogue, the Online Browsing Platform:

Codes before Newsletter I-2

Codes before Newsletter II-2

See also
 Subdivisions of Moldova
 FIPS region codes of Moldova

External links
 ISO Online Browsing Platform: MD
 Districts of Moldova, Statoids.com

2:MD
ISO 3166-2
Moldova geography-related lists